The Parkstad Limburg Stadion is a football stadium in Kerkrade, completed in 2000. With a present-day capacity of 19,979 seats, the stadium was officially opened on August 15, 2000, with a friendly between Roda JC and Real Zaragoza (2–2).

It is the home stadium of football club Roda JC Kerkrade from the Netherlands. In 2005 the Parkstad Limburg Stadion was the hosting stadium for the opening match and the semi-finals of the FIFA World Youth Championship Netherlands 2005.

Gallery

Records
Unofficial records:
 The first played match was a friendly match between Roda JC and Real Zaragoza 2–2, 15 August 2000
 The first goal was scored by Marcos Vales, Real Zaragoza
 The first Roda JC goal was scored by Samir Ouindi

Official records:
 The first official played match was an Eredivisie match between Roda JC and FC Twente 2–2
 The first official goal was scored by Scott Booth
 The first official Roda JC goal was scored by Yannis Anastasiou

Attendances:
 Largest Crowd: 19.300 Roda JC – AC Milan 0–1 UEFA Cup, 21 February 2002
 Lowest Crowd: 2.500 Roda JC – Fylkir 3–0 UEFA Cup, 11 September 2001

Trivia
On 15 January 2005, the South stand was named the Theo Pickée Stand as an honour to the Roda JC chairman, who died in December 2003.

Notable matches
Roda JC – AC Milan 0–1

References

External links 
  

Football venues in the Netherlands
Sports venues in Limburg (Netherlands)
Buildings and structures in Kerkrade
Roda JC Kerkrade